Silverstone is an unincorporated community in Watauga County, North Carolina, United States.

Notes

Unincorporated communities in Watauga County, North Carolina
Unincorporated communities in North Carolina